Alexeyevsky District is an administrative district (raion), one of the twenty-one in Belgorod Oblast, Russia. As a municipal division, it is incorporated as Alexeyevsky Municipal District. It is located in the east of the oblast. Its administrative center is the town of Alexeyevka (which is not administratively a part of the district). Population:  27,493 (2002 Census);

Geography
Alexeyevsky District sits on the eastern edge of Belgorod Oblast, on the border with Voronezh Oblast. It is bordered on the south by Veydelevsky District and Roveskoy District, on the west by Krasnogvardeysky District, on the north by Krasnensky District, and on the east by three districts in Voronezh Oblast: Kamensky District, Olhovatsky District, and Ostrogozhsky District.
  
The terrain is steppe and hilly plain; the district lies on the southeast edge of the Central Russian Upland.  The two main rivers through the district are the Tikhaya Sosna River, which runs northeast into Voronezh Oblast and into the Don River basin, and the Chyornaya Kalitva River, another right tributary of the Don.  Because it is in Central Black Earth area, Alexeyevsky has soil and climate suited to agriculture.

Administrative and municipal status
Within the framework of administrative divisions, Alexeyevsky District is one of the twenty-one in the oblast. The town of Alexeyevka serves as its administrative center, despite being incorporated separately as a town of oblast significance—an administrative unit with the status equal to that of the districts.

As a municipal division, the district is incorporated as Alexeyevsky Municipal District, with the town of oblast significance of Alexeyevka being incorporated within it as Alexeyevka Urban Settlement.

References

Sources

External links
 Alexeyevsky District on Google Maps
 Alexeyevsk District on OpenStreetMap.org



Districts of Belgorod Oblast